Radio Disney Group, LLC was a limited liability company that owned most of the Radio Disney radio stations operating in each U.S. state. Radio Disney Group was owned by the Disney–ABC Television Group and the headquarters were located in New York City, New York.

History
The company was founded on July 30, 2003 by the ABC Radio Networks, a former subsidiary of The Walt Disney Company.

In the sale of the ABC Radio Networks to Citadel Broadcasting (in 2007), the Radio Disney Network and their owned-and-operated radio stations are not included.

In 2010, Radio Disney Group was started to sell their stations located outside of the 25 largest radio markets. The majority of the stations have gone silent, while others changed their format or maintained their regular format. On August 13, 2014, it was announced that Radio Disney will be selling off all of their stations (the majority owned by Radio Disney Group) except KDIS (owned on or before September 26, 2014) to focus on the digital XM radio and livestream radio (such as on TuneIn). While the stations were originally slated to sign off on September 26, the stations remained on the air and continued to carry Radio Disney programming until they were sold. The sale of the last station (WSDZ, to Salem Media Group) was completed on December 18, 2015.

Former owned and operated stations

Notes:
1 Former Radio Disney owned-and-operated station.
2 Former ESPN Radio owned-and-operated station.
3 Former Disney independent radio station.

See also
Radio Disney
Cumulus Media Networks (formerly ABC Radio Networks and Citadel Media)
Disney–ABC Television Group

References

External links
Radio Disney Medianet

Group
ABC Radio Networks
Defunct radio broadcasting companies of the United States
Defunct companies based in New York City
American companies established in 2003
Mass media companies established in 2003
2003 establishments in New York City
2015 disestablishments in New York (state)